The Society of Industrial and Office REALTORS (SIOR) is an international professional commercial and industrial real estate association based in Washington, D.C. It offers a professional designation (SIOR) to commercial brokers and other industry professionals. It has 3,400 members in 686 cities and 36 countries. SIOR designees can hold the following specialty designations: industrial, office, sales manager, executive manager, or advisory service. SIOR also includes associate members, who are corporate executives, developers, educators, and other involved in the commercial real estate industry.

Founding

The idea of forming an organization for industrial real estate brokers began in 1939. Despite the continued growth of industrial real estate, its specialists had little representation within the National Association of Real Estate Boards, the predecessor to today's National Association of Realtors With this in mind and anticipating the increased need for industrial spaces on account of the outbreak of World War II, industrial realtors Frank G. Binswanger and David T. Houston, Sr. made an effort to organize and coordinate industrial realtors across the United States and Canada. They were able to gain sponsorship for the founding of Society of Industrial Realtors, and in the fall of 1940 at NAREB's national convention in Philadelphia, and the formation of a national body of industrial realtors was approved. One year and two months later, The United States entered World War II.

The society was instrumental in locating existing, and immediately available, plant space that could be used for the production of defense, and later, war material. Over 200 brokers from across the United States and Canada surveyed suitable facilities and reported their findings to the War Department (now the Department of Defense).

References

Real estate industry
Professional titles and certifications
Professional associations based in the United States
Organizations based in Washington, D.C.